Sequeira is a Portuguese freguesia ("civil parish"), located in the municipality of Braga. The population in 2011 was 1,811, in an area of 4.35 km².

References

Freguesias of Braga